This article contains a list of all matches played during the 2016 Super Rugby regular season

Matches

The fixtures for the 2016 Super Rugby competition were released on 28 September 2015:

Round 1

Round 2

Round 3

Round 4

Round 5

Round 6

Round 7

Round 8

Round 9

Round 10

Round 11

Round 12

Round 13

Round 14

Round 15

Round 16

Round 17

References

2016 Super Rugby season
Super Rugby lists